The  Washington Redskins season was the franchise's 11th season in the National Football League (NFL) and their 6th in Washington, D.C. Finishing at 10-1 The team improved on their 6–5 record from 1941.  They would end the season by winning the NFL Championship against the Chicago Bears, 14–6.

Regular season

Schedule

Standings

Postseason

NFL Championship Game

All-Star Game

References

Washington
Washington Redskins seasons
National Football League championship seasons
Washington